William James Clayson (12 July 1897 – 1973) was an English professional footballer who played as an inside right in the Football League for Brentford, Crewe Alexandra, Barnsley, Chesterfield, Torquay United and York City. He was a prolific goalscorer for Scarborough across three spells with the club in the Midland League.

Personal life 
Prior to becoming a professional footballer, Clayson served in the British Army and later became a publican in Scarborough.

Career statistics

Notes

1897 births
People from Wellingborough
1973 deaths
English footballers
Association football forwards
Wellingborough Town F.C. players
Brentford F.C. players
Crewe Alexandra F.C. players
Barnsley F.C. players
Chesterfield F.C. players
Scarborough F.C. players
Torquay United F.C. players
York City F.C. players
English Football League players
20th-century British Army personnel